Alexander James John Wallace (1874 – 1899) was an English professional footballer who played as a goalkeeper.

References

1874 births
1899 deaths
Footballers from Sheffield
English footballers
Association football goalkeepers
Attercliffe F.C. players
Grimsby Town F.C. players
English Football League players